Everything is a 1996 spoken word album by Henry Rollins. Everything is the audiobook of Rollins' book Eye Scream which was written over a period of nine years from 1986 to 1995. Eye Scream covers a number of social issues over that time period including racism, homophobia, and police brutality. The album features Rollins' spoken word accompanied by jazz musicians Charles Gayle and Rashied Ali.

Track listing
 "Everything" – 12:36
 "Everything (Continued)" – 12:23
 "Everything (Continued)" – 13:24
 "Everything (Continued)" – 12:28
 "Everything (Continued)" – 12:25
 "Everything (Continued)" – 12:00
 "Everything (Continued)" – 9:52
 "Everything (Continued)" – 9:48
 "Everything (Continued)" – 8:02
 "Everything (Continued)" – 15:05

Personnel 
Henry Rollins – vocals, spoken word
Charles Gayle – violin, saxophone, piano, score, editing
Rashied Ali – drums, percussion, score, editing
Juan Bohorquez – editing, dialogue editor
Alyson Careaga – producer
Juliette Conroy – photography
Mark Droescher – design
Perkin Barnes – engineer
Yaron – engineer

References

External links
 Everything audiobook at the Henry Rollins Shop
 Eye Scream book at the Henry Rollins Shop

Henry Rollins albums
Spoken word albums by American artists
Live spoken word albums
1996 albums
1997 non-fiction books
Audiobooks by title or series
Thirsty Ear Recordings albums